Craig y Forwyn may refer to:

 Craig y Forwyn (Conwy), a limestone crag near the village of Llanddulas in Wales
 Craig y Forwyn (Denbighshire), a limestone crag near the town of Llangollen in Wales